Fred Armisen is a comedian, actor, writer, producer, and musician.

He is the recipient of numerous awards, including multiple Primetime Emmy Awards and a Grammy Award nomination. He is known for his appearances in film, and television. Armisen has been nominated for fourteen Primetime Emmy Awards for his work in television for writing for Saturday Night Live, Portlandia, and Documentary Now!. He was also nominated for the Grammy Award for Best Comedy Album for Standup to Drummers (2015). In 2012, he won the Peabody Award for Portlandia in 2012. He has received seven Writers Guild of America Award nominations winning twice for Portlandia (2013), and Saturday Night Live (2017).

Major associations

Primetime Emmy Awards

Grammy Awards

Industry awards

Peabody Awards

Writers Guild Award

References 

Lists of awards received by American actor